Christine K. Cassel is a leading expert in geriatric medicine, medical ethics and quality of care. She is planning dean of the new Kaiser Permanente School of Medicine. Until March 2016, she was president and CEO of the National Quality Forum. Previously, Cassel served as president and CEO of the American Board of Internal Medicine (ABIM) and the ABIM Foundation.

Cassel is one of 20 scientists chosen by U.S. President Barack Obama to serve on the President's Council of Advisors on Science and Technology, which advises the president in areas where an understanding of science, technology, and innovation is key to forming responsible and effective policy.  She is the co-chair and physician leader of a PCAST working group that made recommendations to the president on issues relating to health information technology, advances in technology for hearing, technology and aging, and ensuring the safety of the nation's drinking water.

In addition to having chaired influential Institute of Medicine (IOM)  reports on end-of-life care and public health, she served on the IOM's Comparative Effective Research Committee mandated by Congress to set priorities for the national CER effort (PCORI). Modern Healthcare  has recognized Cassel among the 100 most influential people in health care, and among the 50 most influential physicians in 2013 and 2014 . An active scholar and lecturer, she is the author or co-author of 14 books and more than 200 journal articles on geriatric medicine, aging, bioethics and health policy. She edited four editions of Geriatric Medicine, a leading textbook in the field. Her most recent book is Medicare Matters: What Geriatric Medicine Can Teach American Health Care.

Cassel has been recognized by NIH as one of the leading women leaders in science, and was the first woman to be president of the American College of Physicians and to be chair of the American Board of Internal Medicine.

A national leader in efforts to inspire quality care, she was a founding member of the Commonwealth Fund's Commission on a High Performance Health System, and served on the IOM committees that wrote the influential reports To Err is Human and Crossing the Quality Chasm. She was appointed by President Clinton to the President's Advisory Commission on Consumer Protection and Quality in the Health Care Industry in 1997. She has served on the board of the Greenwall Foundation since 1992, the board of the Kaiser Foundation Hospitals and Health Plans since 2002 and the board of the National Physician Alliance since 2006.  She also sits on the editorial board of The Journal of the American Medical Association (JAMA).

She is also respected as a scientific leader, having served on the advisory committee to the NIH Director from 1995 to 2002 and as president of the American Federation for Aging Research. She is an adjunct professor of medicine and senior fellow in the Department of Medical Ethics and Health Policy at the University of Pennsylvania School Of Medicine. Cassel's previous positions include dean of the School of Medicine and vice president for medical affairs at Oregon Health and Science University, chair of the Department of Geriatrics and Adult Development at Mount Sinai School  of Medicine in New York, and chief of General Internal Medicine at the University of Chicago.

While she is certified in internal medicine and geriatric medicine, she does not participate in the ABIM Maintenance of Certification program. She is a former chair of the ABIM board of directors, and is a former president of the American College of Physicians. The recipient of numerous international awards and honorary degrees, Cassel is an Honorary Fellow of the Royal Colleges of Medicine of the U.K. and Canada, the European Federation of Internal Medicine, and is a Master of the American College of Physicians.

Education
A graduate of the University of Chicago, Cassel received her medical degree from the University of Massachusetts Medical School and completed a residency in internal medicine at the Children's Hospital of San Francisco and a fellowship in geriatrics at the Veterans Administration Medical Center in Portland, Oregon. Additionally, she completed a bioethics health policy fellowship program at the University of California, San Francisco. She is the recipient of numerous honorary degrees and awards of distinction, including Fellowship in the Royal Colleges of Medicine in the United Kingdom and Canada, and Mastership in the American College of Physicians. Cassel is board certified by the American Board of Internal Medicine in internal medicine and geriatric medicine though she notably does not participate in the Maintenance of Certification (MOC) program, a program which that she herself spearheaded during her tenure as CEO of the ABIM. She received an honorary degree from NYIT in 2016.

Controversy 
Cassel's leadership roles and remuneration across multiple organizational domains in healthcare—regulatory (National Quality Forum), educational (Kaiser Medical School), board certification (ABIM), and private industry (Premier, Inc.) have led to concerns about conflicts of interest. While heading the National Quality Forum, Cassel was also paid hundreds of thousands of dollars by Kaiser Foundation Health Plans and Hospitals and Premier, Inc., which both had a stake in the NQF's decisions. A medical ethics expert called this "absolutely egregious."

According to a Newsweek reporter, the ABIM used obfuscatory accounting techniques during and after Cassel's tenure: "I had an easier time figuring out the compensation of officials at Enron, WorldCom and Adelphia—all famous for lying on financial filings—than I did for those at the ABIM, where enormous effort seems to have been taken to make murky what should be crystal clear." The ABIM reportedly paid Cassel $1.7 million in her final year.

Selected bibliography

Books
Medicare Matters: What Geriatric Medicine Can Teach American Health Care (2005) 
Ethical Patient Care (2000), Geriatric Medicine (Fourth Edition)
A Practical Guide to Aging (1997), *Approaching Death (1997)
Encyclopedia of Bioethics (1995), Ethical Dimensions in the Health Professions (1993)
Nuclear Weapons and Nuclear War: A Sourcebook for Health Professionals (1984)
Medicare Matters: What Geriatric Medicine Can Teach American Health Care (2005)
Ethical Patient Care (2000)
Geriatric Medicine (Fourth Edition), A Practical Guide to Aging (1997) 
Approaching Death (1997)
Encyclopedia of Bioethics (1995)
Ethical Dimensions in the Health Professions (1993)

Articles
Cassel CK. Statistics and Ethics: Models for strengthening protection of human subjects in clinical research.
Jain SH, Cassel CK. Societal Perceptions of Physicians: Knights, Knaves or Pawns? 
Cassel, CK, Reuben, DB. Specialization, subspecialization and sub-subspecialization in internal medicine.
Cassel CK, Guest J.  Choosing wisely: helping physicians and patients make smart decisions about their care. 
Cassel CK.  Retail clinics and Drugstore Medicine.  
Cassel CK, Jain SH.  Assessing Individual Physician Performance-Does Measurement Suppress Motivation? 
Cassel CK, Hood V, Bauer W.  A Physician Charter:  The Tenth Anniversary.  Annals of Internal Medicine, 2012;157(4):290-291
Conway PH, Cassel CK.  Engaging Physicians and Leveraging Professionalism-A key to Success for Quality Management and Improvement.
Graber ML, Wachter RM, Cassel CK.  Bringing Diagnosis Into the Quality and Safety Equations.
Kesselheim JC, Cassel CK.  Service: An Essential Component of Graduate Medical Education.
Tilburt JC, Cassel CK.  Why the Ethics of Parsimonious Medicine Is Not the Ethics of Rationing.
Agrawal S, Taitsman J, Cassel C.  Educating Physicians About Responsible Management of Finite Resources.

See also
American Board of Medical Specialties

References

External links
National Quality Forum Site
 American Board of Internal Medicine Site
The ABIM Foundation Site
Pritzker School of Medicine, University of Chicago

Year of birth missing (living people)
Living people
American geriatricians
Women geriatricians
Oregon Health & Science University faculty
Hastings Center Fellows
American health care chief executives
Members of the National Academy of Medicine